Tinea circinata may refer to:

 Pityriasis rotunda
 Tinea corporis